Daniel Charles Mio (12 May 1941 – 23 September 2021) was a French politician and teacher.

Biography
Mio was born in Somain on 12 May 1941. His father was a train station manager. He studied at the École normale d'instituteurs de Douai from 1956 to 1960 and spent his military service in Saumur from 1962 to 1964. He became a teacher of mathematics at the Collège Victor-Hugo in Somain.

Mio moved to Rieulay in 1966 and became a Municipal Councilor in 1971. In 1977, he was elected mayor, a position he held until 2006. He was involved in the certification of spoil tip #144, which became the base des Argales. The area then became the Parc naturel régional Scarpe-Escaut and included parts of communes in the Arrondissement of Douai in 1986. He became its first President in 1989. He became a member of the Regional Council of Nord-Pas-de-Calais, serving from 1982 to 1992 and again from 1997 to 2004.

Mio resigned as mayor of Rieulay in 2006 and was replaced by Laurent Houllier. He became an Officer of the Ordre national du Mérite in 2013.

Daniel Mio died in Lille on 23 September 2021 at the age of 80.

References

1941 births
2021 deaths
French politicians
French educators
Mayors of places in France
Socialist Party (France) politicians
People from Somain, Nord